Clive Mitten (born 24 February 1959) is a British musician and a member of the band Twelfth Night, both between November 1978 and December 1986 and again between June 2007 and December 2012, with a one-off reunion in 2014.

He returned to live and recorded music in October 2016 with the formation of The C:Live Collective.

References 

1959 births
Living people